Harbin–Jiamusi intercity railway is a high-speed railway with in Heilongjiang province of China, connecting the capital Harbin to Jiamusi. With an expected journey time of two and a half hours from Harbin to Jiamusi. Total cost of the project is budgeted to be 34.714 billion yuan. The project started construction on June 30, 2014, and opened to traffic by September 30, 2018.

Overview
This railway starts from Harbin, approaches Binxian, Fangzheng, Yilan and finally to the Jiamusi. The stations along the route are Harbin, Zhao'antun, Binxi North, Binxi East, Binzhou, Bin'an, Shenglizhen, Rixingtun, Shuanglonghu, Fangzheng, Demoli, Gaoleng, Dalianhe, Yilan, Hongkeli, Xinghua, Jiamusi West and Jiamusi.

References

high-speed railway lines in China
Rail transport in Heilongjiang
Railway lines opened in 2018

25 kV AC railway electrification